Mario Alberto Cuéllar Saavedra (born 5 May 1989) is a Bolivian professional footballer who plays for Club Jorge Wilstermann as a central defender.

Career
Cuellar played for Sport Boys Warnes when they won the Apertura 2015–16 Liga de Fútbol Profesional Boliviano season. He then joined Club Blooming before re-signing with Sport Boys Warnes in July 2017. In December 2018 Cuellar joined Nacional Potosi from Club San José with whom he had won the 2018 Bolivian Primera División season Clausura.

Cuellar joined Club Jorge Wilstermann ahead of the 2023 season from Real Santa Cruz.

International career
On 23 March 2017, Cuéllar started a 2018 FIFA World Cup qualification game for the Bolivia national football team away against the Colombia national football team.

Honours
Sport Boys Warnes
First Division – LPFB Era:2015-A

Club San José
Bolivian Primera División: 2018-C

References

External links

1999 births
Living people
Sportspeople from Santa Cruz de la Sierra
Bolivian footballers
Association football defenders
Bolivian Primera División players
Sport Boys Warnes players
Club Petrolero players
Club Blooming players
Club San José players
Oriente Petrolero players
Bolivia international footballers